The Last Hour is an Indian supernatural crime thriller web series on Amazon Prime Video. Starring Sanjay Kapoor, Karma Takapa, Shahana Goswami, Raima Sen, Shaylee Krishen and Mandakini Goswami, this web series is created, directed and produced by Amit Kumar and Anupama Minz. The story revolves around the life of a mysterious shaman who can talk to spirits of dead people, and the drama that unfolds around it. The series premiered on the OTT platform Amazon Prime Video on May 14, 2021.

Plot 
Arup is a Mumbai-based Police officer who is assigned a case after his transfer to the northeast. An actress from Bengal is brutally raped and murdered. In between the investigation, we see many locals on the run for saving their lives. Dev, is an archer who is seen shooting arrows in the wilderness.

Dev is a Shaman who can communicate with the soul of the dead body and relive their last hour. Arup takes help from Dev for solving murders in the vicinity. However, Dev always finds a way to find something more than he is required by using his Shaman power. He also manages to check-on Pari, Arup's daughter, while he falls in love.

Yama Nadu is following Dev to kill him because Dev injured his eye that can envision a person's death. He is assisted by his right-hand, Thapa.

Cast
 Sanjay Kapoor as DCP Arup Singh
 Karma Takapa as Dev
 Shahana Goswami as SI Lipika Bora
 Raima Sen as Nyima
 Clifford Liu as Commissioner Bhutia
 Robin Tamang as Yama Nadu
 Tenzein Choden as Doma
 Shaylee Krishen as Pari Singh
 Mandakini Goswami as Amoo
Dewashish lama as Pinto
 Vivek Pradhan as Young Dev
 Jatin Payeng as Boatman
 Bisharanjan Sapam as Jo
 Chien Ho Liao as Inspector Jaideep Rana
 Lapchen Lepcha as Constable Raj
 Shivangi Kumar as Arzoo Mukherjee
 Edwin Rai as SI Tamang
 Kiki Lhamu Bhutia as Eila
 Biru Tamang as Sonam
 D.K Lepcha as Sonam's Mother
 Lanuakum Ao as Thapa
 Prashant Sharma as Male Reporter
 Younita Pandey as Tattoo artist

Episodes

Season 1

Reception
As per Prateek Sur from The Free Press Journal, the producers and directors made a good decision of casting local actors over the big shots. The beauty of the Northeast is very well portrayed. Beautiful locations from the northeast are hardly utilized in Indian cinema and web series scene, but The Last Hour did a good job on that. He also says that the web series seems too long for the premise and could be an easy 2.5–3 hours movie to start with.

Raja Sen from Live Mint Lifestyle is very much impressed by Jayesh Nair's cinematography. He says that it is exquisite. Raja says that Takapa is a magnetic performer and matches the narrative naturally.

Scroll.in sums up its review in a single line that says the web series could deliver a lot more based on its unusual theme, but it somehow falls short to make justice with the unique storyline.

Tatsam Mukherjee from First Post wrote "Despite exoticising the North-East, Sanjay Kapoor's series tries to be authentic and manages to make some bold choices."

References

External links 

 
 The Last Hour at Amazon Prime Video

Amazon Prime Video original programming
2021 Indian television series debuts
Hindi-language web series